Elumathur is a township in the Indian state of Tamil Nadu. It is located 19 km south of Erode, in the western part of Tamil Nadu.

The native language is Tamil.

Governance
Elumathur is part of the Modakkurichi constituency. Elections for the legislative assembly are held every five years. It is a part of the Erode constituency that votes for parliamentary elections. It is a part of a gram panchayat. Elections are held every five years for panchayat president.

https://findmygov.in/en/tamil-nadu/erode/modakurichi-block/elumathur

Small villages located in Elumathur panchayat include Mosuvan Palli, Avvalur, Pudhupalayam, Kaarakaattu Valasu, Muthuiayan Valasu, Aathikaattu Valasu, and Mettupalayam.

Culture
Cultural practices resemble those in other parts of Tamil Nadu. The majority of the people are Hindus, while Christians and Muslims constitute minor proportions.

Demographics

As of the 2011 Population Census, the population of Elumathur was 8929: 4389 males and 4540 females among a total of 2712 families. 726 children were age 6 and under, comprising 8.13 8.13% of the total population.

The percentage of people below the poverty line is around 3%, much lower than the national average of 29.8% and the state average of 17.1%.

Economy
The primary occupation is agriculture. For cultivation, farmers depend on water resources from Bhavani Sagar and Mettur dam. The soil is predominantly black, along with some red loamy soil.

References 

Cities and towns in Erode district